The 1994 Troy State Trojans football team represented Troy State University—now known as Troy University—as an independent during the 1994 NCAA Division I-AA football season. Led by fourth-year head coach Larry Blakeney, the Trojans compiled a record of 8–4. For the second consecutive season, Troy State advanced to the NCAA Division I-AA Football Championship playoffs, where the Trojans lost to James Madison in the first round. The Trojans were ranked No. 10 in the final Sports Network poll. The team played home games at Veterans Memorial Stadium in Troy, Alabama.

Schedule

References

Troy State
Troy Trojans football seasons
Troy State Trojans football